Vienna Nightrow is an annual international sprint rowing regatta in Vienna (Austria) of the Erster Wiener Ruderclubs LIA for coxed eights at night.

Concept
A team of former rowers, trainers, functionaries of rowing clubs, referees and functionaries of the Austrian rowing federation have set the aim to promote the rowing sport in several media, so they tried to create a new attractive form of this sport. Vienna Nightrow is a rowing regatta, which is held on a 350 meters race course on the Old Danube in Vienna. The heats of the regatta start in the early afternoon and proceed to the finals, which are held in the dark and floodlight. Next to the coxed eights there are also rookie corporate teams which start in the quad scull.

Vienna Nightrow 2011
Vienna Nightrow had been held on Saturday, 2 July 2011 for the first time.

19 coxed eights from Germany, Austria and Switzerland started. Next to the coxed eights there competed four corporate teams.

Participating clubs:
  Erster Wiener Ruderclub LIA
  Ruderverein Friesen
  Ruderverein Austria
  Ruderverein Normannen
  Ruderverein Staw
  Ruderverein Wiking Bregenz
  Ruderverein Wiking Linz
  Wassersportverein Ottensheim 
  Wiener Ruder Club Donaubund
  Wiener Ruderclub Pirat
  Mannheimer Ruderverein Amicitia von 1876
  Grasshoppers Club Zürich

Participating companies:
 Krammer&Friends
 m.schneider
 Österreichischer Automobil-Club
 Wien Energie

Vienna Nightrow 2012
Vienna Nightrow 2012 was held on Saturday, 30 June 2012 for the second time.

32 coxed eights from Great Britain, Italy, Slovakia, Slovenia, Hungary and Austria started. Next to the coxed eights there competed fourteen corporate teams.

Participating clubs:
  Erster Wiener Ruderclub LIA
  Gmundner Ruderverein
  Ruderverein Friesen
  Ruderverein Austria
  Ruderverein Normannen
  Ruderverein Wiking Linz
  Ruderverein Staw
  Ruderverein Villach
  Wassersportverein Ottensheim
  Wiener Ruder Club Donaubund
  Wiener Ruderclub Pirat
  Wiener Ruderklub Argonauten
  Wiener Ruderklub Donau
  Crabtree Boat Club
  Tisza Evezős Egylet
  Canottieri Lecco
  Primorska Univerza
  Studentsko Veslasko Drustvo
  Rowing Club Slávia STU Bratislava
  Slnava Piestany

Participating companies:
 Arealis Immobilien
 BDO Austria
 Donau-Universität Krems
 Hotel Flemings International
 IFUB
 Krammer&Friends
 Lomography la sardina
 m.schneider
 Profil-Reiseverlag
 Technische Universität Wien
 TU Wien IBMP
 Vienna-LED
 Wien Energie

Vienna Nightrow 2013
Vienna Nightrow was held on Saturday, 29 June 2013 for the third time.

37 coxed eights from Belgium, Germany, Italy, Croatia, Poland, Slovakia, Slovenia, Hungary and Austria started. Next to the coxed eights there competed twelve corporate teams. In 2013 there had been a cooperation with the University of Vienna at the Vienna Nightrow, so next to the club eights there competed five teams of universities of Europe.

Participating clubs:
  Erster Wiener Ruderclub LIA
  Gmundner Ruderverein
  Ruderclub Mondsee
  Ruderteam Universität Wien
  Ruderverein Austria
  Ruderverein Ellida
  Ruderverein Friesen
  Ruderverein Normannen 
  Ruderverein Seewalchen
  Ruderverein Wiking Linz
  Ruderverein Staw
  Ruderverein Villach
  Salzburger Ruderklub Möve
  Union Ruderverein Pöchlarn
  Wassersportverein Ottensheim
  Wiener Ruder Club Donaubund
  Wiener Ruderclub Pirat
  Wiener Ruderklub Argonauten
  Wiener Ruderklub Donau
  Studentsport Limburg
  Ruderteam Universität Zagreb
  Vk Tresnjevka
  Crefelder Ruderclub
  Frankfurter RG Germania 1869
  Neusser Ruderverein
  Ruderclub Germania Düsseldorf
  Ruderteam Universität Passau
  Györi Vizügy
  Ruderteam Universität Venedig
  Ruderteam Universität Warschau
  Rowing Club Ljubljanica
  Slnava Piestany
  Rowing Club Slávia STU Bratislava

Participating companies:
 Arealis Immobilien
 Caldersys Austria
 ETI - Express Travel International
 Gebäudeverwaltung Karner KG
 m.schneider
 Maillog
 The Red Bulletin
 SAE Institute
 SMN Investment Services
 TU Wien IBMP
 Vienna-LED
 Wien Energie

References

External links
  Website of Vienna Nightrow

Annual sporting events in Austria
Rowing competitions in Austria
Annual events in Vienna
Summer events in Austria